The Laratinga Wetlands, constructed in 1999, is a wetland located in Mount Barker, South Australia. It is named after the Aboriginal Peramangk peoples' name for the Mount Barker Creek, "Laratinga".

References

See also 

Wetlands of South Australia
Constructed wetlands in Australia